Ajellidine is a village in Ouezzane Province in north-central Morocco. It lies to the northwest of the Al Wahda Dam and its reservoir.

References

External links
 Maplandia

Populated places in Ouezzane Province